This is a list of known black holes that are close to the Solar System, which Earth is part of.

It is thought that most black holes are solitary, but black holes in binary or larger systems are much easier to detect. Solitary black holes can generally only be detected by measuring their gravitational distortion of the light from more distant objects.
As of February 2022, only one isolated black hole has been detected, OGLE-2011-BLG-0462, around 5,200 light-years away.

List

See also
 List of black holes
 List of most massive black holes
 Lists of astronomical objects
 NGC 3201 – a globular cluster with many black holes
NGC 7727 – a galaxy with the closest confirmed binary black hole at 89 million light years away

References

nearest black holes
nearest black holes
nearest black holes